Rosemary Casals and Billie Jean King successfully defended their title, defeating Françoise Dürr and Ann Jones in the final, 3–6, 6–4, 7–5 to win the ladies' doubles tennis title at the 1968 Wimbledon Championships.

Seeds

  Rosie Casals /  Billie Jean King (champions)
  Maria Bueno /  Nancy Richey (third round)
  Françoise Dürr /  Ann Jones (final)
  Lesley Bowrey /  Judy Tegart (semifinals)

Draw

Finals

Top half

Section 1

Section 2

Bottom half

Section 3

Section 4

References

External links

1968 Wimbledon Championships – Women's draws and results at the International Tennis Federation

Women's Doubles
Wimbledon Championship by year – Women's doubles
Wimbledon Championships
Wimbledon Championships